Limnonectes heinrichi is a species of frog in the family Dicroglossidae. It is endemic to Indonesia, where it occurs on Sulawesi.

This frog lives near streams in forested habitat. It is uncommon and may be threatened by deforestation. It is also caught for food. Some populations occur in Bogani Nani Wartabone National Park.

References

heinrichi
Amphibians of Indonesia
Taxonomy articles created by Polbot
Amphibians described in 1933